Hohenzollern-Haigerloch was a small county in southwestern Germany. Its rulers belonged to the Swabian branch of the House of Hohenzollern. It became part of the neighboring Hohenzollern-Sigmaringen in 1767.

History

The more famous younger Franconian branch of the Hohenzollern family became Burgraves of Nuremberg, Margraves of Brandenburg, Kings of Prussia, and finally Emperors of Germany. Unlike their northern relatives, the Swabians remained Catholic.

The county of Hohenzollern-Haigerloch was created in 1576, when Karl I of Hohenzollern died and his lands were divided between his three sons:
 Eitel Friedrich IV of Hohenzollern-Hechingen (1545–1605)
 Charles II of Hohenzollern-Sigmaringen (1547–1606)
 Christoph of Hohenzollern-Haigerloch (1552–1592)

All three territories were located in south-western Germany and were fiefs of the Holy Roman Empire. The area is now part of the German Land of Baden-Württemberg. Hechingen, Sigmaringen, and Haigerloch were  the capitals of the three states.

Counts of Hohenzollern-Haigerloch (1576-1767)

 Christoph, Count 1575–1592 (1552-1592), third surviving son of Karl I of Hohenzollern
 Johann Christoph, Count 1592–1620 (1586-1620)
  Karl, Count 1620–1634 (1588-1634)

Per treaty, at the extinction of the line, the county reverted to the principality of Hohenzollern-Sigmaringen.

 Franz Anton, Count 1681–1702 (1657-1702), second surviving son of Meinrad I, Prince of Hohenzollern-Sigmaringen
 Ferdinand Leopold, Count 1702–1750 (1692-1750)
  Franz Christoph Anton, Count 1750–1767 (1699-1767)

With the death of the last count, the county was permanently incorporated into the principality of Hohenzollern-Sigmaringen.

References

External links
Family tree of the House of Hohenzollern-Haigerloch

1767 disestablishments
States and territories established in 1576

Former states and territories of Baden-Württemberg
Early Modern history of Germany
Counties of the Holy Roman Empire